James Saburo Shigeta (June 17, 1929 – July 28, 2014) was an American actor of Japanese descent. He was noted for his roles in The Crimson Kimono (1959), Walk Like a Dragon (1960), Flower Drum Song (1961), Bridge to the Sun (1961), Die Hard (1988), and Mulan (1998). In 1960, he won the Golden Globe Award for Most Promising Newcomer – Male, along with three other actors.

In his early career, Shigeta often played romantic male lead roles, which were almost nonexistent for an actor of Asian descent during his time, making him a trailblazer in Asian American representation in media. The Goldsea Asian-American Daily magazine listed him as one of the "Most Inspiring Asian-Americans Of All Time".

Before his Hollywood career he found success as a pop singer and performer abroad, especially in Japan and Australia.

Early life 
Born in the Territory of Hawaii in 1929 as a Sansei, a third-generation Japanese-American, Shigeta was a 1947 graduate of President Theodore Roosevelt High School, and studied drama at New York University.  After completing ROTC, he enlisted in the Hawaii National Guard's 298th Infantry, prior to his 1951 enlistment in the United States Marine Corps during the Korean War. He served for two-and-a-half years, and rose to the rank of Staff Sergeant.

Career

Singing career 
Shigeta entered and won first prize on Ted Mack's television talent show, The Original Amateur Hour in 1950. Embarking on a singing career in Los Angeles, he teamed with Hawaiian operatic tenor Charles K.L. Davis. Their agent at the time gave them the non-ethnic sounding stage names of "Guy Brion" for Shigeta, and "Charles Durand" for Davis. They developed a supper club musical career in the United States, singing at venues such as the Mocambo and the Los Angeles Players Club. Despite that success, breaking into the movies eluded him.

During the Korean War Shigeta enlisted in the United States Marine Corps, where he entertained troops in California.  En route to Korea, the ceasefire led Shigeta to Japan, where he was discharged from the Marines and hired by the theatrical division of Toho Studios.

Shigeta did not speak Japanese until Toho Studios in Tokyo invited him to be a musical star under his real name in Japan. He became a success in all media aspects of his day –radio, television, stage, supper clubs, movies, recordings– to such an extent that he became widely known as "The Frank Sinatra of Japan".

In 1958, the Nichigeki Theatre in Tokyo exported their extravaganza Cherry Blossom Show to Australia with Shigeta as the male lead. The show was performed at the Empire Theatre in Sydney, Her Majesty's Theatre in Brisbane, the Theatre Royal in Adelaide, and Her Majesty's Theatre in Melbourne. The show was a big success, with one Australian reviewer writing about Shigeta, "... has matinee idol good looks and a soothing baritone voice that should send the record companies mad for his autograph on recording contracts."

Shigeta returned to the United States to sing on The Dinah Shore Show. By 1959 he was the star of the Shirley MacLaine–Steve Parker production of Holiday in Japan  at the New Frontier Hotel and Casino in Las Vegas.

In 1969, Shigeta toured the United States in the lead role of The King and I, with Melva Niles and Pam Cavan co-starring in the production.

Acting 
When movies began to open up for him, Shigeta took acting lessons from seasoned dialogue coach Leon Charles.

Shigeta first came on screen in the U.S., in 1959 as Detective Joe Kojaku in The Crimson Kimono, a detective story that featured an interracial romantic triangle between Kojaku, his partner Sgt. Charlie Bancroft (played by Glenn Corbett), and Christine Downes (portrayed by Victoria Shaw). Shigeta's character was groundbreaking for the 1950s, an Asian American detective played by an Asian American actor with regular American speech patterns, rather than a non-Asian made up to pass as Asian who speaks in broken English.

Paramount Pictures and James Clavell cast Shigeta in the 1960 release Walk Like a Dragon, as Cheng Lu, a young Chinese man in the American old west who resents that Chinese must be subservient to white people. When filming began, Shigeta was still starring in Holiday in Japan in Las Vegas. An arrangement was made to transport him after his last show to the Paramount studio by ambulance to make sure he arrived on time. The technical advisor to Shigeta on the film was Benson Fong, who taught Shigeta how to mount a horse Chinese style. Jack Lord has first billing in this movie, which pits Shigeta against Lord for the affections of Kim Sung, played by Nobu McCarthy. Shigeta and McCarthy would work together again in the 1965 Perry Mason episode, "The Case of the Wrongful Writ," while Shigeta and Lord would work together in the 1968 Hawaii Five-O episode Deathwatch.

The 1961 romantic comedy Cry for Happy had Shigeta co-starring with Glenn Ford, Donald O'Connor and Miyoshi Umeki in a tale about Korean War era United States Navy photographers in Japan.

In 1961, Shigeta was cast as Wang Ta, a role originated by Ed Kenney on Broadway, in the Academy Award-nominated movie version of Rodgers and Hammerstein's Flower Drum Song with Nancy Kwan and Miyoshi Umeki playing the love interests.

He was cast as World War II Japanese diplomat Hidenari Terasaki opposite Carroll Baker as Gwen Terasaki in the 1961 biographical movie Bridge to the Sun. A rarity for its era, the movie told the true story of a racially mixed marriage set against the background of the war between the United States and Japan.

Shigeta guest starred in many television shows, beginning with Alcoa Premiere in 1961, as a Korean War era Chinese Communist who tortured star Lloyd Bridges. He continued to act in television up through Avatar: The Last Airbender in 2005.

In 1965, Shigeta starred in Paradise, Hawaiian Style with Elvis Presley.

In 1965, Shigeta worked with Raymond Burr in the Perry Mason episode "The Case of the Wrongful Writ", cast as lawyer Ward Toyama who finds himself as the defendant. Shigeta worked with Raymond Burr two more times, in the 1969 Ironside episode "Love My Enemy", and the 1971 episode "No Motive for Murder" of the same series.

From 1969 to 1972, Shigeta had recurring appearances on the TV hospital drama Medical Center, in which he alternately appeared as the Resident Doctor and Doctor Osaka, for seven episodes. He played the role of Chief Resident in the series 1969 2-hour pilot U.M.C.

He also continued starring in films. In 1976, he portrayed the famous Japanese admiral Chūichi Nagumo in Midway. In 1988, he played the ill-fated corporate executive Joseph Yoshinobu Takagi in the action adventure film Die Hard. Cage II: The Arena of Death from 1994 pits star Lou Ferrigno against Shigeta's character of underworld crime boss Tim Yum Yum. Shigeta lent his voice to Disney's 1998 animated film Mulan.

Awards and legacy 
James Shigeta shared the 1960 Golden Globe Award for Most Promising Male Newcomer with actors George Hamilton, Troy Donahue and Barry Coe.

In 2005, Shigeta received a "Visionary Award" from the Asian-American theatre organization, East West Players, at their annual anniversary gala in Los Angeles.

In 2006, Shigeta was among the actors, producers and directors interviewed in the documentary The Slanted Screen, directed by Jeff Adachi, about the representation of Asian and Asian American men in Hollywood.

Death 
Shigeta died in his sleep on July 28, 2014, at age 85 in Beverly Hills. His funeral was held at the First Congregational Church of Los Angeles, and he was interred in the National Memorial Cemetery of the Pacific.

Filmography

Film

Television

References

External links 

GoldenSea Asian American Profile
New York Times Movie Biography
Nichi Bei Times Q&A

1929 births
2014 deaths
American male actors of Japanese descent
American male singers
American singers of Asian descent
President Theodore Roosevelt High School alumni
United States Marines
American military personnel of Japanese descent
American musicians of Japanese descent
Traditional pop music singers
Male actors from Honolulu
Musicians from Honolulu
Male actors from Hawaii
Tisch School of the Arts alumni
20th-century American male actors
21st-century American male actors
American male film actors
American male television actors
American male musical theatre actors
American male voice actors
American film actors of Asian descent
Decca Records artists
New Star of the Year (Actor) Golden Globe winners
20th-century American singers
20th-century American pianists
Hawaii people of Japanese descent
American male pianists
Burials in the National Memorial Cemetery of the Pacific